Vedavathi Prabhakar Rao is an Indian carnatic classical music singer. She is synonymous with light classical music like the concerts, radio programmes, films or temple devotionals.

Awards
She has received Kirti Puraskar from Telugu University in 2013 for her poetic works.

References

Living people
Women Carnatic singers
Carnatic singers
Year of birth missing (living people)
Place of birth missing (living people)